Mihaela Buzărnescu was the defending champion, but chose not to participate.
María-Teresa Torró-Flor won the title after defeating Cristina Mitu in the final, 6–3, 6–4.

Seeds

Draw

Finals

Top half

Bottom half

References
 Main Draw
 Qualifying Draw

Trofeul Popeci - Singles
Trofeul Popeci